Mohammad Nezam Al Olama, known as Nezam Al Olama Estahbanati (6 January 1849, in Estahban, Fars Province – 20 December 1942, in Estahban, Fars Province): was a renowned faqih and one of the most prominent scholars and well-known Ulama of the Qajars and Rezā Shāh era, according to Fars-Nama-ye Naseri and .

References
The information in this article is based on that in its Persian equivalent.    
 Idem, "Merchants of Shiraz in the Late 19th Century," a monograph prepared at the Center for Middle Eastern Studies, Harvard University, 1987. 
 A. Banuazizi and A. Ashraf, "The Urban Elite and Notables of Shiraz in the Late Nineteenth Century," paper presented at the 11th Annual Meeting of the Middle East Studies Association, New York, November 1977. 
 Fasāʾī, tr. Busse. D. Demorgny, "Les réformes administratives en Perse: Les tribus du Fars," RMM 22, 1913, pp. 85–150; 23, 1913, pp. 3–108 (based entirely on Fasāʾī’s work).
 D. A. Lane, "Hajjī Mīrzā Ḥasan-i Shīrāzī on the Nomadic Tribes of Fārs in the Fārs-nāmeh-i Nāṣirī," JRAS, 1923, pp. 209–31.
 Hasan Fasāʾī, Fars-Nama-ye Naseri, Amirkabir Publications, Tehran, 2003
 Saeedi Sirjani, A. A., Vaqayeʿ-ye Ettefaqiyeh, Zehn Aviz Publications, Tehran, 2008

External links

 The Encyclopædia Iranica

1849 births
1942 deaths
Iranian Shia clerics
People from Fars Province
Iranian Shia scholars of Islam